The Katun (Katuń; , Kadın) is a river in the Altai Republic and the Altai Krai of Russia. It originates in the Katun glaciers on the southwestern slope of Belukha Mountain. The river freezes up in late November or early December and breaks up in early or mid-April. The main tributaries of the Katun are, from source to mouth: Koksa (left), Kucherla (right), Argut (right), Chuya (right), Ursul (left), Sema (left) and Isha (right). The river is navigable. 

In its upper reach of the Katun flows down the distant and sparsely populated area, but a few kilometers downstream near the village Kuyus, the coastal population density grows steadily and the area downstream of the village Ust-Sema is the most populated. There are numerous buildings, holiday camps and various guest houses in the pine forest near the village. The main settlements along the Katun are, from source to mouth: Ust-Koksa, Katanda, Inya, Chemal, Manzherok, Souzga, Aya, Mayma, Srostki and Verkh-Katunskoye.

See also
Altai flood

References

Rivers of Altai Krai
Rivers of the Altai Republic